Wästberg is a surname. Notable people with the surname include: 

Olle Wästberg (born 1945), Swedish journalist, politician, and diplomat
Per Wästberg (born 1933), Swedish writer